United Nations General Assembly Resolution 34/37, titled Question of Western Sahara, is a resolution of the United Nations General Assembly about the situation in Western Sahara, which was adopted on 21 November 1979 at the 34th session of the General Assembly. It became the eighteenth United Nations General Assembly document concerning the situation of that territory.

The resolution reaffirmed "the inalienable right of the people of Western Sahara to self-determination and independence, in accordance with the Charter of the United Nations, the Charter of the Organization for African Unity and the objectives of the UN General Assembly Resolution 1514, and the legitimacy of their struggle to secure the enjoyment of that right.". It also welcomed the Algiers Agreement between the Polisario Front and the Mauritania as an "important contribution in the process of achieving peace", while "deeply deplores the aggravation of the situation resulting from the continued occupation of Western Sahara by Morocco and the extension of that occupation to the territory recently evacuated by Mauritania", urging Morocco to "join the peace process and to terminate the occupation of the territory of Western Sahara".

Draft resolution 
On 21 November 1979, the United Nations General Assembly adopted resolution A/RES/34/37 by a recorded vote of 85 in favour to 6 against, with 41 abstentions and 20 countries not voting. The table below shows related voting results:

See also
National Question

References 

34 37
United Nations General Assembly resolutions concerning Mauritania
United Nations General Assembly resolutions concerning Morocco
United Nations General Assembly resolutions concerning Western Sahara
1979 in the United Nations
1979 documents
November 1979 events
1970s in Western Sahara
National questions